Vivian Jones may refer to:
Vivian Malone Jones (1942–2005), one of the first two African Americans to enroll at the University of Alabama in 1963
Vivian Jones (singer) (born 1957), Jamaican-born British reggae singer
Vivian Vance or Vivian Roberta Jones (1909–1979), American actor